Still is the twentieth single by Japanese hip-hop group Lead, released on December 12, 2012, and first to bring in their new era for The Showcase album. The single took the #4 position on the Oricon weekly singles charts and remained on the charts for two weeks.

The single was released in four formats: a standard CD, a limited CD+DVD edition and three limited edition CD versions. Each of the limited editions contained a different b-side, and each version harbored a different back cover.

Still became their last single with group leader and lead vocalist Hiroki Nakadoi, whereas he left the group shortly after due to feelings of inadequacy.

Information
Still is the twentieth single by Japanese hip-hop group Lead, released on December 12, 2012. It was their first to be released after their seventh studio album Now or Never, which had been released five months prior in July. The single performed well on the Oricon Singles Charts, where it held the #4 position for the week, remaining on the charts for two consecutive weeks. This became their second single in a row to chart in the top five, Wanna Be With You ranked at #3, making it a first since their debut in 2002.

The single was released in five editions, a standard CD and four limited editions that corresponded to each member, each with differing content. The standard edition carried the title track and the b-side "Fuyuiro Girl" (冬色ガール / Winter Colored Girl), along with their corresponding instrumentals. Jacket A, which corresponded with Hiroki, carried the two tracks, along with the music video for "Still." Jacket B, corresponding with Shinya, carried the song "Ordinary" (stylized as ORDINARY); Jacket C corresponded with Keita and held the song "anytime"; Jacket D corresponded with Akira and featured the track "Masquerade."

"Still" was written by Canadian DJ and record producer Vincent DeGiorgio, and Swedish songwriter Anderz Wrethov, with the lyrics written by the members of Lead. The music was performed by Seiji Motoyama. The b-side "Fuyuiro Girl" was written and composed by musical composer Kenji Tokuda. "Masquerade," which was on Akira's corresponding edition Jacket D, was written by composers Danny Schofield, Matthew Tishler and Robyn Newman. The music for the piece was performed by DJ Blackout. The lyrics were done by 7chi子♪.

Background and composition
The title track "Still" was written by Canadian DJ and record producer Vincent DeGiorgio, and Swedish songwriter Anderz Wrethov, with the lyrics written by the members of Lead. The music was performed by Seiji Motoyama. Vincent has worked in the music industry since the 1980s and has worked with many well-known artists, including Hikaru Utada, Petula Clark and Caro Emerald. Anderz Wrethov, who goes by his stage name "Wrethov", began his career in 1999 and has worked with the likes of Arashi, KAT-TUN and Super Junior.

The b-side "Fuyuiro Girl" was written and composed by musical composer Kenji Tokuda. "Masquerade," which was on Akira's corresponding edition Jacket D, was written by composers Danny Schofield, Matthew Tishler and Robyn Newman. The music for the piece was performed by DJ Blackout. Robyn Newman had previously worked with Japanese artist Crystal Kay for her song "I'll Be There" from her Spin the Music album. The lyrics were done by 7chi子♪.

Hiroki's departure

After Lead celebrated their tenth anniversary with the Leader's Party 10! concert for their fan club in March 2013, vocalist Hiroki Nakadoi stepped away from the group. His final single release with Lead was for their single Still, which had been released on December 12, 2012, and his departure was in April the following year.

Hiroki began to discuss his feelings about leaving to the other members prior to his departure, explaining how he felt that they had surpassed him since they debuted in 2002 with "Manatsu no Magic"; however, due to their reassurance and saying that they would all "do their best together," he had decided to stay on, putting more effort into his overall performance. Despite this, he fell into a depression, believing that he was unable to "catch up" to his friends' level and began talking about wanting to leave again.

Prior to Hiroki making his final decision, the other members, Keita Furuya, Akira Kagimoto and Shinya Tanuichi, had questioned if they should remain as a unit if Hiroki decided to leave. When Hiroki finalized his decision, with full support to the others as a group, they chose to stay together due to the constant support of their fans.

Track listing

Charts

References

External links
 Lead Official Site

2012 singles
2012 songs
Japanese-language songs
Pony Canyon singles
Lead (band) songs